Kristen Ridgway Flores is Founder and CEO of The Feel Good Film Festival in Hollywood, California and an American actress, set designer, production designer, and film producer.

Early life
Ms. Flores received her early theatre and acting training in Seattle, Washington, where she participated in numerous theatrical productions including "Helen Keller", "Guys and Dolls", "South Pacific",  "Narnia", and "Little Mary Sunshine".   
She continued her theatrical  and acting studies in Santa Barbara, California at the "Westmont College Theatre Arts Department" where she received her theatre and communications degrees.   Once relocating to Hollywood, she pursued a curriculum of film studies.

Film and Television
Flores contributions include actress, production designer, set designer, and producer for Hollywood films and television programs, including the television comedy series, "The Playbook".  Flores' first credited film in 2005 was  "West Bank Story", the Academy Awards winning, fast-paced musical comedy.  In 2006-2007 Flores worked in the art department of the television series, Heroes, which received the 2007 Academy of Television Arts & Sciences nomination for the Art Director's Guild Award. From 2007 until 2010 she tried out animation at Nickelodeon on the kids' classic cartoon, "SpongeBob SquarePants", a television series that has been awarded numerous primetime Emmy Awards for outstanding animated programming.  In 2009, she began working as a producer in the 2009 film "Dandelion Dharma". She also produced the 2011 MTV reality television series, "Cuff’d", released August 2011.

The Feel Good Film Festival
As Flores' passion is to positively influence Hollywood, she created Hollywood's non-profit Film festival, The Feel Good Film Festival, taking on responsibility for overall artistic direction including responsibility for film selection.  The Festival premiered in August 2008, providing a prime platform for winning projects that are entertaining, optimistic, humorous or heartwarming and leave the audience feeling good. Flores' goal is to provide a film viewing experience for the entire family that encourages the development, production, and distribution of short or feature-length films with positive themes, happy endings, that make audiences laugh, and that capture the beauty of our world. She searches for newly produced American, international, independent, and family-friendly submissions from around the world and is responsible for bringing wider attention to independent filmmakers including those listed in the awards section at The Feel Good Film Festival.  The focus is screening movies where the Festival's audience members leave the theaters feeling better than when they entered 100% of the time.  To achieve this, she hunts down features with positive views on life, humor, and positive scenes where at the end of it, you’re feeling better.  She created the Festival to provide audiences with laugh-out-loud comedy and ultimately for having loads of fun.  The positive theme and energy of the Festival and its many high-quality films stands out amongst the sea of Los Angeles film festivals. She aims for the Festival to screen happy indie films with positive themes that lift energy levels of the audience members so they can bring that positivity back into the world they live in. "Unfortunately the news and other outlets do not focus on the `happy' ... they are used to focusing on the fear. We at FGFF hope to give an alternate view on life in media.".

Personal life
Flores is active in her community, Highland Park Los Angeles, California.   She and her husband, actor Dominic (Stephen) Flores, reside in Los Angeles, Highland Park, California with their daughter and three sons.

Filmography

References

External links

Skip Bolden,“Includes Interview with Kristen Flores at the Feel Good Film Festival”, Aug. 12. 2011
Actors Reporter, Hosted by Brett Walkow, video and pictures “Yellow Carpet at the 4th Annual Feel Good Film Festival at Raleigh Studios in Hollywood, California”, Aug. 19, 2011.

1982 births
Actor-managers
American film actresses
American television actresses
Actresses from Seattle
Living people
Westmont College alumni
American women film producers
Film producers from Washington (state)
21st-century American women